Clifford Everett "Bud" Shank Jr. (May 27, 1926 – April 2, 2009) was an American alto saxophonist and flautist. He rose to prominence in the early 1950s playing lead alto and flute in Stan Kenton's Innovations in Modern Music Orchestra and throughout the decade worked in various small jazz combos. He spent the 1960s as a first-call studio musician in Hollywood. In the 1970s and 1980s, he performed regularly with the L. A. Four. Shank ultimately abandoned the flute to focus exclusively on playing jazz on the alto saxophone. He also recorded on tenor and baritone sax. His most famous recording is probably the version of "Harlem Nocturne" used as the theme song in Mickey Spillane's Mike Hammer. He is also well known for the alto flute solo on the song "California Dreamin'" recorded by The Mamas & the Papas in 1965.

Biography
Bud Shank was born in Dayton, Ohio, United States. He began with clarinet in Vandalia, Ohio, but had switched to saxophone before attending the University of North Carolina. While at UNC, Shank was initiated into the Pi Kappa Alpha fraternity. In 1946, he worked with Charlie Barnet before moving on to Kenton and the West coast jazz scene. He also had a strong interest in what might now be termed world music, playing Brazilian-influenced jazz with Laurindo Almeida in 1953 and 1954. In 1958, he is the first American jazz musician to record in Italy, with an Italian jazz orchestra conducted by Ezio Leoni (aka Len Mercer), paving the way for Chet Baker and others who would follow Shank's tracks recording in Milan with Maestro Leoni. His world music collaborations continued in 1962, fusing jazz with Indian traditions in collaboration with Indian composer and sitar player Ravi Shankar.

In 1974, Shank joined with Ray Brown, Shelly Manne (replaced by Jeff Hamilton after 1977), and Laurindo Almeida to form the group the L.A. Four, who recorded and toured extensively through 1982. Shank helped to popularize both Latin-flavored and chamber jazz music, and as a musician's musician also performed with orchestras as diverse as the Royal Philharmonic, the New American Orchestra, the Gerald Wilson Big Band, Stan Kenton's Neophonic Orchestra, and Duke Ellington.

In 2005, he formed the Bud Shank Big Band in Los Angeles to celebrate the 40th anniversary of Stan Kenton's Neophonic Orchestra.

A documentary film about Bud Shank, Bud Shank "Against the Tide" Portrait of a Jazz Legend, was produced and directed by Graham Carter of Jazzed Media and released by Jazzed Media as a DVD (with a companion CD) in 2008. The film has been awarded four indie film awards including an Aurora Awards Gold.

Shank died on April 2, 2009, of a pulmonary embolism at his home in Tucson, Arizona, one day after returning from San Diego, California, where he was recording a new album.

Discography

References

External links
Interview at All About Jazz
Bud Shank, encyclopedia entry at Jazz.com
 
 

1926 births
2009 deaths
American jazz alto saxophonists
American male saxophonists
American jazz flautists
Big band saxophonists
Cool jazz flautists
Cool jazz saxophonists
Jazz alto saxophonists
Mainstream jazz saxophonists
West Coast jazz saxophonists
Deaths from pulmonary embolism
Musicians from Dayton, Ohio
Concord Records artists
20th-century American saxophonists
Jazz musicians from Ohio
20th-century American male musicians
American male jazz musicians
The L.A. Four (band) members
20th-century flautists